Juliette Schoppmann (born 18 March 1980) is a German singer, songwriter and vocal coach who came to fame as the runner-up of the debut season of the television series Deutschland sucht den Superstar, the German Idol series adaptation. 

Born and raised in Stade, Schoppmann was a trained musical artist before she participated in the show for which she recorded the number-one hit "We Have a Dream" and the album United along with all other finalists. After DSDS, she signed with BMG and released her moderately successful debut album Unique (2004) which spawned the top ten hits "Calling You" and "I Still Believe".

Following the termination of her contract, Schoppmann returned to musical theatre and worked as a songwriter and vocal coach. In 2012, she participated in the sixth season of Das Supertalent, the German version of Got Talent franchise, where she finished sixth in the final. In 2014, Schoppmann recorded and released "To the Sky", the official anthem for the 2013–2014 season of the Four Hills Tournament. The same year, she was consulted as a coach on Das Supertalent. In 2018, Schoppmann also became a vocal coach on the 15th season of Deutschland sucht den Superstar.

Discography

Studio albums

Singles

References

External links

19 Recordings artists
Deutschland sucht den Superstar participants
Living people
Schoppmann, Juliette
1980 births
21st-century German women singers